Peter O'Reilly may refer to:

 Peter O'Reilly (civil servant) (1827–1905), settler and official in the Colony of British Columbia
 Peter Joseph O'Reilly (1850–1923), Irish-born Catholic bishop in the United States
 Peter O'Reilly (hurler) (1902–1940), Irish hurler
 Peter O'Reilly (Gaelic footballer) (1916–1994), Irish Gaelic football manager, coach and player
 Peter O'Reilly (cricketer) (born 1964), Irish sports journalist and former cricketer